Kofi Amoako Atta (born 17 June 1997) is a Ghanaian footballer who plays as a midfielder for Turkish club Giresunspor on loan from Bursaspor in the Süper Lig.

Professional career
Atta moved to Turkey from the lower divisions in Ghana as a youth player. Atta signed his first professional contract on 6 September 2017. Atta made his professional debut for Bursaspor in a 3-0 Süper Lig win over Akhisar Belediyespor on 10 September 2017.

On 31 January 2018, he was loaned out to Giresunspor for the rest of the season.

References

External links
 
 
 Bursaspor Profile

1997 births
Living people
Footballers from Accra
Ghanaian footballers
Bursaspor footballers
Süper Lig players
Association football forwards
Ghanaian expatriate footballers
Ghanaian expatriate sportspeople in Turkey
Expatriate footballers in Turkey